The 1994 Brownlow Medal was the 67th year the award was presented to the player adjudged the fairest and best player during the Australian Football League (AFL) home-and-away season. Greg Williams of the Carlton Football Club won the medal by polling thirty votes during the 1994 AFL season.

Leading vote-getters 

* The player was ineligible to win the medal due to suspension by the AFL Tribunal during the year.

References 

Brownlow Medal
1994
Brownlow Medal